Béatrix is an 1839 novel by French author Honoré de Balzac (1799–1850) and included in the Scènes de la vie privée section of his novel sequence La Comédie humaine.

It first appeared in the periodical Le Siècle in August 1839, and appeared in volume form the same year.  Balzac based the characters in this novel on real figures: Félicité des Touches, a celebrated musician and writer, is based on George Sand. Béatrix de Rochefide is based on Marie d'Agoult (who wrote under the pen name of Daniel Stern); Gennaro Conti is based on Franz Liszt; Claude Vignon is based on Gustave Planche.

Plot
A handsome young man named Calyste du Guénic is in love with the older woman, Félicité des Touches, a famous writer who uses the pen name of Camille Maupin.  Félicité at first does not reciprocate Calyste's feelings, and Calyste falls in love with the blonde marchioness Béatrix de Rochefide.  Béatrix is a beautiful but selfish woman; one critic remarked in 1897 in regards to Béatrix that “for cold-blooded cruelty and vulgarity she is unexampled, and her efforts to keep her youth and her hold over men are drawn in Balzac’s heaviest and most pitiless manner.”

Béatrix had already had an affair with Gennaro Conti, and Calyste has an additional rival in the form of Claude Vignon.  Félicité des Touches (Camille Maupin) tries to help Calyste win Béatrix's heart, thus sacrificing her own.  Calyste's efforts are ultimately a failure, and Béatrix is taken away by Gennaro Conti. 
 
Calyste is devastated by his failure, but promises his dying father to get married.  Félicité des Touches enters a convent, but before she does, she uses her fortune to arrange a marriage for Calyste with a woman named Sabine de Grandlieu.   When Calyste encounters Béatrix again in Paris, his wife Sabine struggles to win back her husband's affections after Calyste falls for Béatrix again.  Subsequently, through the intercession of Count Maxime de Trailles, Béatrix falls for another young man, and Calyste comes to his senses.

Balzac describes Béatrix as follows:

References

Books of La Comédie humaine
Novels set in 19th-century France
1839 French novels
Novels about writers
Novels by Honoré de Balzac